Majgaon is a census town in Sonitpur district in the Indian state of Assam.

Demographics
 India census, Majgaon had a population of 6820. Males constitute 52% of the population and females 48%. Majgaon has an average literacy rate of 83%, higher than the national average of 59.5%: male literacy is 83%, and female literacy is 83%. In Majgaon, 9% of the population is under 6 years of age.

References

Cities and towns in Sonitpur district
Sonitpur district